Denmark participated in the Eurovision Song Contest 2001 with the song "Never Ever Let You Go" written by Søren Poppe, Stefan Nielsen and Thomas Brekling. The song was performed by the duo Rollo and King. In addition to participating in the contest, the Danish broadcaster DR also hosted the Eurovision Song Contest after winning the competition in 2000 with the song "Fly on the Wings of Love" performed by the Olsen Brothers. DR organised the national final Dansk Melodi Grand Prix 2001 in order to select the Danish entry for the 2001 contest in Copenhagen. Ten songs competed in a televised show where "Der står et billede af dig på mit bord" performed by Rollo and King was the winner as decided upon through two rounds of jury voting and public voting. The song was later translated from Danish to English for the Eurovision Song Contest and was titled "Never Ever Let You Go".

Denmark competed in the Eurovision Song Contest which took place on 12 May 2001. Performing as the closing entry during the show in position 23, Denmark placed second out of the 23 participating countries, scoring 177 points.

Background 

Prior to the 2001 contest, Denmark had participated in the Eurovision Song Contest thirty times since its first entry in 1957. The Danish national broadcaster, DR, broadcasts the event within Denmark and organises the selection process for the nation's entry. The broadcaster organised the Dansk Melodi Grand Prix 2001 national final in order to select Denmark's entry for the 2001 contest; Denmark has selected all of their Eurovision entries through Dansk Melodi Grand Prix.

Before Eurovision

Dansk Melodi Grand Prix 2001
Dansk Melodi Grand Prix 2001 was the 32nd edition of Dansk Melodi Grand Prix, the music competition that selects Denmark's entries for the Eurovision Song Contest. The event was held on 17 February 2001 at the MCH Messecenter Herning in Herning, hosted by Keld Heick and televised on DR1. The national final was watched by 1.998 million viewers in Denmark with a market share of 86%, making it the most popular show of the week in the country.

Format 
Ten songs competed in one show where the winner was determined over two rounds of voting. In the first round, the top five songs based on the combination of votes from a public televote and a seven-member jury panel qualified to the superfinal. In the superfinal, the winner was determined again by the votes of the jury and public.

The seven-member jury panel was composed of:

 Michael Carøe – actor
 Birthe Wilke – singer, represented Denmark in the Eurovision Song Contest 1957 and 1959
 Jesper Bæhrenz – music journalist, radio and television host
 Ann-Mette Elten – singer
 Jesper Winge Leisner – composer
 Anne Dorthe Michelsen – singer and composer
 Katrine Ring – DJ, music journalist and music expert

Competing entries 
DR opened a submission period between 29 September 2000 and 3 November 2000 for composers to submit their entries. All composers and lyricists were required to be Danish citizens or have Danish residency, while all songs were required to be performed in Danish. The broadcaster received 332 entries during the submission period. A seven-member selection committee selected ten songs from the entries submitted to the broadcaster, while the artists of the selected entries were chosen by DR in consultation with their composers. The competing songs were announced on 13 December 2001 with their artists being announced on 4 January 2001. Among the artists was Helge Engelbrecht who represented Denmark in the Eurovision Song Contest 1987 as part of Bandjo. On 26 January 2001, it was announced that Kenny Lübcke who represented Denmark in the Eurovision Song Contest 1992 would replace Jesper Daus as the lead singer of the Parber Kerstein Band after Daus withdrew for health reasons.

Final 
The final took place on 17 February 2001. In the first round of voting the top five advanced to the superfinal based on the votes of a public televote (4/5) and a seven-member jury (1/5). In the superfinal, the winner, "Der står et billede af dig på mit bord" performed by Rollo and King, was selected by the public and jury vote. The voting results of each of Denmark's four regions as well as the jury voting results in the superfinal were converted to points which were each distributed as follows: 4, 6, 8, 10 and 12 points. 

In addition to the performances of the competing entries, Irish Eurovision Song Contest 1980 and 1987 winner Johnny Logan and Maltese Eurovision 2001 entrant Fabrizio Faniello performed as the interval acts.

At Eurovision
The Eurovision Song Contest 2001 took place at Parken Stadium in Copenhagen, Denmark, on 12 May 2001. The relegation rules introduced for the 1997 contest were again utilised ahead of the 2001 contest, based on each country's average points total in previous contests. The 23 participants were made up of the host country, the "Big Four" (France, Germany, Spain and the United Kingdom), and the 12 countries with the highest average scores between the 1996 and 2000 contests competed in the final. On 21 November 2000, a special allocation draw was held which determined the running order and the Netherlands was close the show and perform in position 23, following the entry from Greece. At the contest, Rollo and King performed the English version of "Der står et billede af dig på mit bord", titled "Never Ever Let You Go". Denmark finished in second place with 177 points.

The show was broadcast on DR1 with commentary by Hans Otto Bisgaard and Hilda Heick. The Danish spokesperson, who announced the Danish votes during the final, was 1983 Danish Eurovision entrant Gry Johansen. The contest was watched by a total of 2.6 million viewers in Denmark with the market share of 95%.

Voting
Below is a breakdown of points awarded to Denmark and awarded by Denmark in the contest. The nation awarded its 12 points to Malta in the contest.

References

2001
Countries in the Eurovision Song Contest 2001
Eurovision
Eurovision